The 1996–97 Croatian First Football League was the sixth season of the Croatian top-level football league since its establishment.

Stadia and personnel 

 1 On final match day of the season, played on 1 June 1997.

Prva A HNL

Results

Prva B HNL

Relegation play-offs

Group A

Group B

Replay

Top goalscorers

See also 
 1996–97 Croatian Football Cup

External links 
 1996–97 in Croatian Football at Rec.Sport.Soccer Statistics Foundation

Croatian Football League seasons
Cro
Prva Hnl, 1996-97